Helmut Kickton (born 28 June 1956 in Cologne, West Germany) is a German church musician, publisher and multi-instrumentalist.

Kickton studied church music at the Robert Schumann Hochschule in Düsseldorf with Hans-Dieter Möller and Hartmut Schmidt. In 1986 he passed his examination (A) with distinction for improvisation and music history. The following years he learned to play most common instruments. He regularly performs on the organ, recorder, violin, viola, cello, double bass, euphonium, guitar and kettledrums.

Since 1987 he has been cantor of the diakonie church in Bad Kreuznach. Together with the kreuznacher-diakonie-kantorei he developed the model of the Integrative Kantorei, which unites voices and instruments. Inspired by historical sources, in 2000 he introduced the layout with the choir in front of the orchestra.

In 2002  he founded the kantoreiarchiv of free digital sheet music. He published more than 20000 files (PDF) for choir, orchestra, brass band, recorder and organ.

Compositions
 Fuge über zwei Kyriethemen für Sequenzer
 Diptychon über „Ave maris stella“ und „“
 Postludium
 Intrade für 6 Blechbläser über „Veni Creator Spiritus“

Gallery

References

External links
 www.kantoreiarchiv.de
 www.kantoreiarchiv.de (Mirror website)

1956 births
Living people
German classical organists
German male organists
Organ improvisers
German multi-instrumentalists
Arrangers of church music
German male conductors (music)
People from Bad Kreuznach
Musicians from Cologne
Online music and lyrics databases
German Internet celebrities
Robert Schumann Hochschule alumni
21st-century German conductors (music)
21st-century German male musicians
21st-century organists
German music websites
Male classical organists